Kapralova Society Journal is an open-access, scholarly journal dedicated to promoting women in music. It has been published since 2003 by the Kapralova Society, a non-profit publisher and music society based in Toronto, Canada, whose mission is "to promote the music of Czech composer Vítězslava Kaprálová (1915–1940) and to build awareness of women's contributions to musical life." The journal is published twice a year, in winter and summer (formerly in spring and fall) and features analytical essays, articles on women composers, scores, women's music festival reports, CD and book reviews, interviews with women musicians, and announcements of international projects, symposia, and conferences on the subject of women in music, diversity in music, and institutional advocacy.

In 2021, a selection of the journal articles was published in The Women in Music Anthology.

Selected articles

References

External links 
 

Music journals
Women in music
Women's studies journals
Publications established in 2003
Biannual journals